Ray Saari (born April 18, 1995) is a former American soccer player.

Early life

Saari was raised in the Kansas City area and attended Oak Park High School. He was diagnosed with testicular cancer at the age of 15 and underwent several months of chemotherapy before returning to the high school's soccer team.

Career

College
Saari spent his entire college career at the University of Tulsa.  He was a starter all four years. He made a total of 69 appearances, and tallied 12 goals and 12 assists. His sophomore season he was named to the American Athletic Conference All-conference team. In his senior season despite missing five matches, Saari finished as the team's second leading scorer and earned a spot on the NSCAA All-East region first team.

Saari spent three seasons with NPSL side Tulsa Athletic, playing a pivotal role in winning conference titles in two of his three seasons there. His advanced attacking role with the club yielded nearly a point a game and showcased his creative ability in the final third. Saari is among the all-time point leaders at the club registering 12 goals and 13 assists.

He also played in the Premier Development League for Houston Dutch Lions.

Professional
On March 22, 2017, Saari signed his first professional soccer contract, joining USL club Seattle Sounders FC 2.  He made his professional debut four days later in a 2–1 defeat to Sacramento Republic. On September 13, 2018 Saari was released from Seattle Sounders FC 2 having played in 39 matches over two seasons for S2 and recording four goals and six assists.

On January 3, 2019, Saari joined USL Championship side Sacramento Republic FC.

On November 12, 2019, Saari returned to the Kansas City area and signed a contract with the Kansas City Comets of the Major Arena Soccer League.

Saari signed with USL Championship club OKC Energy FC on February 3, 2020.

References

External links

S2 bio
Tulsa Golden Hurricane bio

1995 births
Living people
American soccer players
Association football midfielders
Houston Dutch Lions players
National Premier Soccer League players
Sacramento Republic FC players
Tacoma Defiance players
OKC Energy FC players
Soccer players from Kansas City, Missouri
Tulsa Athletic players
Missouri Comets players
Tulsa Golden Hurricane men's soccer players
USL Championship players
USL League Two players
Major Arena Soccer League players